Lunden ÖBK is a Swedish football club located in Göteborg.

Background
Lunden Överås Bollklubb was formed in 2007 following the merger of Lundens AIS, Lundens Allmänna Idrottssällskap, with near neighbours Överås BK, Överås Bollklubb.  Both clubs shared their home venue known as Överåsvallen in central / eastern Gothenburg. Lunden AIS was formed in 1930 and played many years in Division 4, but at the beginning of the 2000s progressed to Division 2 for two seasons before once again dropping down to Division 4. Lundens AIS competed in the Svenska Cupen on 20 occasions and played 32 matches in the competition.

Lunden ÖBK currently plays in Division 4 Göteborg A which is the sixth tier of Swedish football. They play their home matches at the Överåsvallen in Göteborg.

The club is affiliated to Göteborgs Fotbollförbund.

Season to season

Lundens AIS competed in the following divisions from 1993 to 2007:

The new club Lunden ÖBK have competed in the following divisions since 2008:

Current squad

Coaching staff

Footnotes

External links
 Lunden ÖBK – Official website
 Lunden ÖBK on Facebook

Football clubs in Gothenburg
Association football clubs established in 2007
2007 establishments in Sweden
Football clubs in Västra Götaland County